Phialella is a genus of hydrozoans. It is the only genus within the monotypic family Phialellidae.

Species 
The following species are recognized within the genus Phialella:

 Phialella belgicae (Hartlaub, 1904)
 Phialella chilensis (Hartlaub, 1905)
 Phialella chiquitita (Millard, 1959)
 Phialella falklandica Browne, 1902
 Phialella fragilis (Uchida, 1938)
 Phialella macrogona Xu, Huang & Wang, 1985
 Phialella parvigastra (Mayer, 1900)
 Phialella quadrata (Forbes, 1848)
 Phialella xiamenensis Huang, Xu, Lin & Guo, 2010
 Phialella zappai Boero, 1987

References 

Phialellidae
Hydrozoan genera